Geo-Force (Prince Brion Markov) is a fictional superhero character appearing in comic books published by DC Comics. Markov is the younger Prince Twin of Markovia and the elder brother of Terra. One of the founding members of the superhero group the Outsiders, he first appeared in a special insert in The Brave and the Bold #200 (July 1983). The character was created by Mike W. Barr and Jim Aparo.

The character has made scattered appearances throughout animated and live-action media, such as Young Justice: Outsiders and the third season of the Arrowverse series Black Lightning, portrayed by Jahking Guillory.

Fictional character biography

Batman and the Outsiders
Dr. Helga Jace used a device to give Prince Brion Markov superpowers with which he could stop an insurrection mounted by the evil Baron Bedlam. Five other superheroes converge on Markovia for various reasons of their own. Veteran heroes Batman, Metamorpho, and Black Lightning join forces with Geo-Force and two other new heroes, Katana and Halo. After stopping the insurrection, the heroes decide to remain together as the Outsiders, with Batman (who has resigned from the Justice League) as team leader.

Brion gets along with his teammates, though he occasionally butts heads with Batman and his teammates due to his short temper. When he is not active as a superhero, Brion attends college in the US and begins dating classmate Denise Howard.

In one of their earliest missions, the Outsiders team up with the Teen Titans, who are led at the time by Batman's sidekick, Robin. Geo-Force is the brother of Tara Markov, also known as Terra, of the Titans. Tara is the product of an affair King Markov (Brion's father) had with an unnamed American woman. Fearing scandal, the king sent Tara to be raised in the United States. Unbeknownst to Geo-Force and her fellow Titans, Terra is secretly a spy working for Deathstroke. Brion is happy to be reunited with his half-sister, though Terra is less happy due to her fears that Brion will say the wrong thing and possibly expose the fictional back-story she has told the Titans about herself and how she gained her powers.

Several weeks later, Terra betrays the Titans for Deathstroke. In the climactic battle between Titans and the alliance of Deathstroke and Terra, Terra's sociopathic personality breaks down as she tries to kill both the Titans and Deathstroke, when Deathstroke's son Joseph intervenes on behalf of the Titans to stop his father. In the end, Terra accidentally kills herself when she tries to bury the Titans alive in a massive rock storm. At first, the Titans do not tell Geo-Force of her betrayal, letting him think that she has died a hero. However, Batman later reveals the truth to Geo-Force, which leaves him even more heartbroken.

In his depression, Geo-Force cannot bring himself to continue wearing his earthtone costume, as it reminds him of Tara, who wore a similar uniform. Designed and suggested by Batman, a new green and gold costume is presented to Brion by his teammates to lift his spirits. It works well, and Geo-Force wears green and gold for most of his career. The colors have a dual importance to Geo-Force as both the colors of his native Markovia's flag, as well as symbolically representing the Earth, from which his powers are derived (green), while reminding him how precious his gifts truly are (gold). By the time he joins the Justice League, however, Geo-Force has returned to another version of his old earthtone uniform.

The Outsiders
After the Outsiders split with Batman, they are privately funded by Markovia. During this time, Geo-Force is the unofficial new leader of the team. This information eventually comes out and Major Disaster destroys their base.

Around this time, the sovereignty of Markovia again comes under threat. Investigating the mysterious new prime minister, Geo-Force leads a team of Outsiders and Infinity, Inc. members back to his homeland. Having grown up in the main castle, it is easy for Geo-Force to lead the team in. He soon discovers that the Psycho-Pirate in the disguise of long-term Outsiders enemy Baron Bedlam is attempting to conquer the country. The two teams join forces to stop Psycho-Pirate and leave on good terms.

Brion, meanwhile, has a one-night stand with Looker when the team is stranded on a desert island. The move strains the relationship between Brion and his girlfriend Denise, as well as Looker's relationship with her husband. Brion and Looker agree to remain platonic friends afterward.

The United States government withdraws any foreign aid from Markovia until that nation releases the true names of the Outsiders. King Gregor, Brion's older brother, is murdered before he can make a decision. Brion becomes king, but he is forced to abdicate and is imprisoned when his sister-in-law, Iona (Gregor's wife), reveals she is pregnant. His teammate Looker reveals to Brion that the murderer of his brother was the team's trusted friend and scientist associate, Doctor Jace. Jace has betrayed the team for the Manhunters because she admires their dedication to knowledge. In the end, Jace dies, along with a mind-controlled Metamorpho. This, along with a second battle with the descendants of teammate Looker, which results in Looker being temporarily stripped of her powers and Halo left injured and comatose, causes the Outsiders to disband and Brion to retire as Geo-Force.

In the early 1990s, however, the Outsiders were revived with former Outsiders Geo-Force, Katana, Halo, and Looker joined by new heroes Faust, Technocrat and Wylde. The latter two are on hand to sell a new battlesuit to Markovia. Queen Iona has teamed up with Roderick, a vampire, in order to kill Geo-Force, though the first attempt makes it seem as if Technocrat is under attack. Using a vampire's inability to be recorded, Roderick frames Geo-Force for Iona's on-air murder, forcing the team to run.

Geo-Force and the Outsiders are on the run for some time, hiding out mostly in America. They eventually clear their names and destroy Roderick and his vampiric legions. At the end of the second Outsiders series, Brion marries his long-time girlfriend, Denise Howard.

During this time, another Terra has appeared as part of a group known as the Team Titans, who appear to have come from the future. This new Terra claims to have been a normal girl who was given Terra's appearance and powers as a result of a DNA virus. Geo-Force's first attempt to talk to her meets with failure when he accidentally gets swept up in a rock column she has created during a loud party.  He finds her again at the Titans headquarters. After a brief fight with her friends, he manages to sit down with her. The new Terra convinces him she is not his sister. The rogue Markovian scientists attack with the intention of forcibly duplicating Terra's powers. Geo-Force and the other Titans rescue her. Further revelations imply that this Terra is in fact from their time, when the original Terra's grave is dug up and her corpse is missing from her coffin.

Brion invites Terra to live in Markovia, which she accepts, as her group of Titans is disbanding. In Markovia, scientists conduct a DNA test in the hopes of discovering if Terra is, in fact, Geo-Force's sister. Terra is afraid of finding out the results, fearful that she might, in fact, be a villainous traitor. When the test results come back positive, Brion lies to Terra, telling her that the results are negative.

Around this time, as part of the Day of Judgement incident, a portal to hell threatens to swallow the country of Markovia. A small team of Outsiders, including the newer Terra, Katana, and the original Halo, are on hand to help combat it.

Geo-Force and Terra become kidnap victims of a strange cult run by a man with mind-control powers. They are rescued by the super-team called the "Birds of Prey".

Geo-Force briefly appears in 52 #35, assisting Metropolis citizens injured in a mass-murder caused by Lex Luthor. He later is a part of the army of heroes gathered by the Justice Society at the end of 52 to battle Black Adam who, in his global killing spree after the death of his wife and brother-in-law, has murdered Terra II. Before the battle, Geo-Force tells Beast Boy not to blame himself for Terra II's death.

Justice League of America
While sailing in his yacht off the coast of Greece, Geo-Force suddenly finds himself losing control over his powers, which have suddenly changed to include his sister's earth manipulation powers. This sudden increase in power, which causes Geo-Force to black out, is ultimately caused by the villainous Deathstroke through as yet unrevealed means.

Geo-Force seeks help from the newly reformed Justice League of America, becoming an unofficial member of the group. This will ultimately be revealed to be Deathstroke's overall plan, as he ultimately confronts Geo-Force in order to blackmail him into becoming a spy, just like Terra, in exchange for Deathstroke's promise to one day remove the added powers he forced upon Geo-Force. Geo-Force informs Superman, Batman, and Wonder Woman of Deathstroke's scheme and agrees to become a double agent: spying on Deathstroke for the League, while spying on the League for Deathstroke.

The scheme falls apart when Lex Luthor organizes a new incarnation of the Injustice League and captures the Justice League. While a prisoner, Geo-Force is brutally tortured alongside Red Tornado at the hands of Gorilla Grodd. While recovering from his injuries, Geo-Force is "traded" to Batman's latest incarnation of The Outsiders, much to Geo-Force's dismay and, ultimately, acceptance.

In DC Universe: Last Will and Testament, Geo-Force confronts Deathstroke in a battle. After contemplating murder, he is talked out of it by Black Lightning and Rocky Davis of the Challengers of the Unknown. He loses a lot of blood to Deathstroke in their fight, but then he sets their confrontation at the same alley and building complex where Deathstroke's second son Jericho was held after being kidnapped.  Slashing his own throat in the same manner as his son was cut lets Deathstroke's guard down, allowing Brion to impale Deathstroke with his own sword through his own body. Believing he has defeated Deathstroke, while sacrificing his own life, he is surprised to wake up in the hospital. It is thought that he single-handedly took down Deathstroke, but no one knows that Geo-Force was trying to commit suicide. Geo-Force becomes the field leader of the Outsiders and is still secretly living with the shame of his actions.

Blackest Night

Geo-Force is visited by his sister, who has been reanimated as a member of the Black Lantern Corps. Claiming to have been freed from the dark force that was controlling her, Tara begs Brion to kill her. However, it is a facade in order to feed on the Outsiders' emotions. Geo-Force turns Terra into a statue and her ring is destroyed by Halo.

Marriage and divorce
Geo-Force later marries his long-time girlfriend, Denise Howard. Since she is not a Markovian, the marriage is annulled by Brion's choice. Unbeknownst to Brion, Denise later tries to undergo the same experiment which transformed Geo-Force into a powerful hero but, because she does not have Markovian blood in her, she gains the same powers but with a changed appearance and loss of sanity, becoming Geode. She is locked up, but escapes to take revenge on Markovia by killing several innocent Markovians. Geo-Force proclaims his affections for Katana, but before she can answer Geo's declaration of love, they are interrupted by Eradicator. Eradicator informs Brion of Geode's escape and her recent attack on Markovia.

Geo-Force and Eradicator go to intercept Geode. The battle with Brion's deranged wife seems one-sided as Geode smacks both heroes around like ragdolls. Eradicator pleads with Geo-Force to use his powers to subdue Geode, but Brion is conflicted over the idea of striking his wife. With Geo-Force unable to take the initiative, Eradicator decides to unleash the full extent of his power to knock Geode unconscious.

Later, Geode is free from her captivity, thanks to an unusual character named Veritas. Veritas wants Geode to begin Markovia's immediate destruction, which will draw out Geo-Force, who pinpoints the center of the disturbance in Markovia and is approached by Veritas. Veritas asks Brion to join him and reestablish Markovia's Old World Order. Brion refuses Veritas' offer and Veritas tells Geode to kill her estranged husband. Geo-Force gathers his strength and becomes a giant rock creature.

On his unfortune, Brion's unstable powers have put Markovia in danger, because his new form consists of Markovia itself and earthquakes begin to spring up. One earthquake opens up a large crevice beneath Geode and Veritas. The two villains fall to their supposed doom and Geo-Force finally realizes that Veritas used Geode to tempt Geo-Force into unleashing his untapped abilities in order to destroy Markovia. Now, Markovia is torn between civil war and the devastation that Brion has inadvertently wrought on his people.

DC Rebirth
In 2016, DC Comics implemented another relaunch of its books called DC Rebirth, which restored its continuity to a form much as it was prior to "The New 52". Prince Brion Markov appears, without his Geo-Force identity or costume, in the miniseries Suicide Squad: Most Wanted. He meets Katana for the first time and helps her and the Suicide Squad battle the terrorist organisation Kobra, attempting to invade Markovia. There is no indication he possesses any superhuman abilities.

During the "Dark Nights: Metal" event it is revealed that Batman had been operating a team known as the Outsiders as a stealth team of black ops for some time, with Metamorpho, Black Lightning, Katana, Halo and Geo-Force.

After the moon was left shattered by Vandal Savage's battle against the Justice League. Geo-Force lent his aid in stabilizing the planets gravitational sphere until his fellow heroes could fix the damages to the Moon.

In the "Watchmen" sequel "Doomsday Clock", Brion Markov was one of the first meta-humans created outside America's programs by Dr. Helga Jace. He is currently leading a new team of Outsiders, based out of Markovia, and has denied any knowledge of working with Batman before. At the time when Superman confronts Doctor Manhattan, Geo-Force arrives with his Outsiders alongside the People's Heroes and the Doomed in an attempt to bring Superman in for what happened in Russia. Geo-Force tells Superman to do the right thing and cooperate. Both foreign superheroes and Black Adam's group start to charge towards Superman to see who will get to him first which intensifies when the other foreign superhero teams show up. The fight is broken up when Doctor Manhattan undoes the experiment that erased the Justice Society of America and the Legion of Super-Heroes from history. 

In Shadow War, he disguised himself as Deathstroke and murdered Ra's al Ghul. He did this to pit the real Deathstroke against Ra's' daughter, Talia al Ghul, against each other and get revenge on both. Deathstroke for what he did to Markov's sister, and Talia for hurting his country.

Powers and abilities
As implied by his code name, all of Brion's powers are in some way related to the planet Earth. He can manipulate the Earth's gravitational field to make an object heavier ("plus-gravity") or lighter ("null-gravity"). He can project scorching "lava blasts" in imitation of terrestrial volcanoes. By using his null-gravity power on himself, coupled with lava blasts for propulsion, Geo-Force can fly at great speeds for short periods of time (his teammate Black Lightning once remarked that Geo-Force weakens after flying 1,000 miles). Geo-Force has demonstrated the ability to manipulate the Earth itself, in a manner similar to Terra. Brion has shown he can turn organic material to earthen mineral with a touch. This ability is not quite explained in the instance where he turns the reanimated corpse of Terra to stone.

Geo-Force possesses impressive superhuman strength, speed and durability. He once used his gravity manipulation powers to enhance his own super-strength, strengthening him sufficiently enough to fight pre-crisis Superman toe-to-toe. When he is shot in the back by the clone of Baron Bedlam, the bullets stagger him, but they do not puncture his skin. Brion has the addition of on again off again earth moving abilities similar to what Tara Markov possessed, for some reason they seemed to fluctuate in continuity. Having enough affinity with the geophysical to aid in keep the planet from splitting into pieces during the War of the Gods. Reportedly his geokinesis is so powerful, that working in conjunction with four other similarly powered individuals, Geo-Force could crack the planet in half. With the return of these abilities however the level of durability he has seems to fluctuate. At one time being slashed by sharp items, usually a deep wound triggering this unstable and largely dormant facet of his powers, leading to violent earthquakes and ground swells. At others, not even being burned by putting his hand over an active candle flame.

He's eventually learned to drudge up and weaponize molten lava from beneath the earth's surface as well during Convergence. Brion Markov has gained his powers due in part to his heritage as a prince of Markovia, as well as the effects of the device designed for manifesting the powers. Only one with royal Markov blood can retain these powers permanently. The source of Geo-Force's powers is the Earth itself. During his first adventure, Geo-Force is apparently killed and buried by enemy soldiers. The Earth nurtured Geo-Force, healing his wounds and restoring him. Through his connection to the earth Geo-Force is able to survive indefinitely without food, sleep or need for respiration; having spent days to weeks on end sitting underground without discomfort.

Geo-Force is at his strongest when he's firmly planted on the ground. His powers and health will deteriorate if he is out of contact with the Earth for long time periods.

Other versions
In the alternate timeline of the Flashpoint event, Brion Markov is the king of Markovia. At some point, he is contacted by Mera while trying to make an alliance with the Atlanteans, due to the Amazonian Invasion of the United Kingdom. He is later captured by Aquaman, who attaches the young king to a machine constructed by Vulko in order to amplify Brion's powers of manipulation of the Earth's gravitational field. It is through Brion that Aquaman manages to cause Western Europe to sink into the sea.

In other media

Television

Live-action
Two variations of Brion Markov / Geo-Force appear in media set in The CW's Arrowverse:
 Dr. Brion Markov appears in the Arrow episode "Darkness on the Edge of Town", portrayed by Eric Floyd. This version is a human scientist for Unidac Industries who invents a device that can manipulate seismic activity. Malcolm Merlyn hires him to weaponize the device before murdering Markov and his staff so Merlyn can use the device on The Glades as part of the "Undertaking".
 An Americanized adaptation of Geo-Force appears in Black Lightning, portrayed by Jahking Guillory. This version is Brandon Marshall, a student at Garfield High alongside Jennifer Pierce. Early in the third season, he reveals his geokinetic metahuman status to her and how Helga Jace killed his mother, Helen, in her experiments before teaming up with Pierce on occasion to fight off an invasion of Markovians. Near the end of the season, he learns Helen was a Markovian and his father had the same geokinetic abilities as him. In response, Marshall keeps Jace in his apartment to gain information about his father.

Animation
 Geo-Force appears in the Batman: The Brave and the Bold episode "Requiem for a Scarlet Speedster!", voiced by Hunter Parrish. This version is a new member of the Outsiders and joins them in helping Batman fight Kobra.
 Geo-Force appears in Young Justice: Outsiders, voiced by Troy Baker. This version is the 17-year-old, fraternal, younger twin brother of Crown Prince Gregor Markov of Markovia. After his younger sister Tara was kidnapped by metahuman traffickers two years earlier, Brion decides to activate his meta-gene so he can stop the traffickers and find his sister, though he was put into a meta-activation tank against his will by Doctors Helga Jace and Simon Ecks. When his villainous uncle Baron Bedlam tries to frame him for the recent murder of his parents, Brion confronts him, but is outmatched due to his inability to control his newly acquired magma-based powers. After Superboy intervenes and defeats Bedlam, Gregor is forced to exile a heartbroken Brion from their home to prevent metahumans from causing further damage to Markovia but asks Superboy to take care of his brother in his place. Following this, Brion begins training with Superboy, Nightwing, Artemis, Halo, Black Lightning, and Forager to better develop and control his abilities. Due to his banishment, family tragedies, and his allies not being able to find Tara fast enough, Brion develops anger issues, though he slowly learns to overcome them. He also enters a relationship with Halo and develops a friendship with Forager. Brion eventually reunites with Tara, though he and his allies are initially unaware of her alliance with the Light. Following this, Brion joins the Team, and later the Outsiders. While on a mission to Markovia to stop Bedlam once more, Brion learns of Tara's deceit. Though she defects to the heroes' side, Zviad Baazovi secretly manipulates Brion into killing Bedlam and usurping Gregor as king of Markovia on the Light's behalf. As of the Young Justice: Phantoms episode "Artemis Through the Looking Glass", Brion has welcomed all metahumans into Markovia, which in turn has caused all non-metahuman Markovians to flee to the neighboring nation of Vlatava. Brion later becomes the leader of a superhero group called the Infinitors.

Miscellaneous
Geo-Force appears in Teen Titans Go! #51. He arrives in America looking for his younger sister, Terra, to bring her back to Markovia. After meeting the Teen Titans, Beast Boy brings him to the school where he met the schoolgirl who resembles Terra. While Geo-Force is certain that the schoolgirl is Terra, he sees that she seems happy now, something he had never seen while she was in Markovia. Deciding not to confront her, he returns to Markovia alone.

References

External links
 DCU Guide: Geo-Force
 Cosmic Teams: Geo-Force
 Atlas of the DC Universe

DC Comics characters with superhuman strength
DC Comics metahumans
Comics characters introduced in 1983
Fictional princes
Fictional kings
Characters created by Mike W. Barr
Fictional characters with earth or stone abilities
Fictional characters with gravity abilities
Characters created by Jim Aparo